, son of Iezane, was a Kugyō or Japanese court noble of the early Kamakura period. He held regent positions as follows:
 sesshō (1237–1242)
 kampaku (1242)
 sesshō (1247–1252)
With a daughter of Kujō Michiie he had a son Motohira.

References

Fujiwara clan
Konoe family
1210 births
1259 deaths
People of Kamakura-period Japan
Japanese Buddhist clergy
13th-century Buddhist monks